María de la Concepción Ramírez Mendoza (8 March 1942 – 10 September 2021) was a peace activist from Guatemala, whose portrait appears on the Guatemalan 25 centavo coin, known as the choca.

Biography 
Ramírez was born on 8 March 1942 in Santiago Atitlán, a town in the department of Sololá. Her father was an evangelical preacher and her mother taught her traditional crafts at home. In 1965 she married Miguel Ángel Reanda Sicay and they went on to have six children.

25 centavo 
In 1959, at the age of 17, her portrait was chosen to feature on the 25-centavo coin as a result of a competition to find the 'prettiest indigenous woman' in Guatemala. The portrait was prepared from photographs by the artist Alfredo Gálvez Suárez. People refer to her portrait as the "woman of the choca" and is recognised by people across the country.

Ramírez was a spokesperson for Tz'utujil culture and was passionate about keeping its traditions and language alive. In 2019, the park in Santiago Atitlán was remodelled to include a monument to her shaped like a 1m choco. 

The coin's design features Ramírez wearing a tocoyal head-dress, which is shaped like Lake Atitlán, and made of fabric wound around the head twenty times. Plaza Concepción in the town was named after her.

In 2018, Ramírez was awarded a pension by the state, as recognition for her life's achievements.

Activism 

Guatemala has a violent political past, and her family was affected by it: on 7 January 1980, her father was tortured to death with 27 other people. On 22 May 1990 her husband was murdered with three other people in a wave of political violence. In reaction to this, Ramírez spoke out against political violence and in 2007 she had the honour of laying a white rose, in Palm of Peace at the National Palace of Culture, and in the delivery of a document related to the internal armed conflict. 

On 8 March 2016, the General Sub-Directorate for Crime Prevention of the National Civil Police in  Santiago Atitlán paid tribute to her on her 74th birthday.

Awards 

 Municipal Order of the Tzutujil Kingdom (2019)

References

External links 
 Concepción Ramírez, the face immortalized in the 25 cents coin 

 Doña Concepción Ramírez, representante de la cultura Tz'utujil

1942 births
2021 deaths
Tz'utujil people
Guatemalan women
Indigenous people of the Americas
Guatemalan indigenous rights activists
Women human rights activists
People from Sololá Department